Dichomeris vindex is a moth in the family Gelechiidae. It was described by Ronald W. Hodges in 1986. It is found in North America, where it has been recorded from Manitoba to New Brunswick, south to Florida, west to Louisiana and Oklahoma.

The larvae feed on Helianthus hirsutus.

References

Moths described in 1986
vigilans